Paimvere is a village in Lääneranna Parish, Pärnu County in southwestern Estonia.

Politician and journalist Mihkel Martna (1860– 1934) was born in Paimvere.

References

 

Villages in Pärnu County
Kreis Wiek